Virgin Hill is a summit in Clark County, Nevada.  It rises to an elevation of 1,808 feet / 551 meters.

History
Virgin Hill is a steep hill that marked where the Mormon Road climbed from the valley of the Virgin River near Riverside to the Mormon Mesa, north of the hill.

References

Mountains of Clark County, Nevada
Mountains of Nevada
Mormon Road